The Iron and Oil League was a minor league baseball league that played in the 1895 and 1898 seasons. League teams were based in Ohio, Pennsylvania, New York and West Virginia.

History

The Iron and Oil League was a minor league formed in the 1890s and existing from time to time in the 1890s and 1900s. In 1898 one of the teams was a black team, the Celeron Acme Colored Giants.

It is sometimes abbreviated as IOL.

Honus Wagner and his brother Butts Wagner played in the league in 1895.  Among other major leaguers, Jack Glasscock and Buck Weaver also played in the league.

Cities represented 
Bradford, PA: Bradford Pirates 1898 
Celoron, NY: Celeron 1895; Celoron Acme Colored Giants 1898 
Dunkirk, NY & Fredonia, NY: Dunkirk-Fredonia 1898 
Franklin, PA: Franklin Braves 1895 
Meadville, PA: Meadville 1898 
New Castle, PA: New Castle Quakers 1895
Oil City, PA: Oil City Oilers 1895, 1898 
Olean, NY: Olean 1898 
Sharon, PA: Sharon 1895 
Titusville, PA: Titusville 1895 
Dennison, OH & Uhrichsville, OH: Twin Cities Twins 1895 
Warren, PA: Warren 1895, 1898 
Wheeling, WV: Wheeling Nailers 1895

Standings and statistics

1895 Iron And Oil League
schedule
Wheeling and Twin Cities entered the league July 16 for the second half. Sharon (16–29) moved to Celeron July 16 for the second half.

1898 Iron And Oil League

Oil City (17–13) transferred to Dunkirk–Fredonia June 18The Black Clereon team disbanded July 5 and was replaced with a white teamOlean disbanded July 14, causing the league to disband.

References

External links
Baseball Reference

Defunct baseball leagues in the United States
Sports leagues established in the 1890s
1890s establishments in the United States
Defunct minor baseball leagues in the United States